Earl Sears (born September 2, 1952) is an American politician who served in the Oklahoma House of Representatives from the 11th district from 2006 to 2018.

References

1952 births
Living people
Republican Party members of the Oklahoma House of Representatives